Muman-e Vasat (also Romanized as Mūmān-e Vosţá; also known as Mūmān-e Bālā and Mūmān-e Vasaţ) is a village in Jahliyan Rural District, in the Central District of Konarak County, Sistan and Baluchestan Province, Iran. At the 2006 census, its population was 443, in 92 families.

References 

Populated places in Konarak County